U.S. Route 10A (US 10A) was an alternate route of US 10 that existed between 1941 and 1967. From 1941 to 1947, it ran between Seattle, Washington, and Missoula, Montana. Since its decommissioning, it has been replaced by Idaho State Highway 200 (SH-200), Montana Highway 200 (MT 200), and US 2. By 1947, it had been rerouted to run concurrently with US 95, as the majority of its former route had been replaced by the western extension of US 2 from Bonners Ferry, Idaho, to Everett, Washington. This change led the highway to begin in Coeur d'Alene, Idaho, rather than in Seattle. It would remain in this configuration until its decommissioning in 1967, as I-90 gradually replaced US 10.

Route description

Washington

US 10A split from US 10 in Seattle. The highway would then follow US 99 (modern Washington State Route 99) north to Everett. There it separated from US 99. It then traveled east across the Cascade Range via Stevens Pass to central Washington. In Spokane, the highway followed US 195 to Sandpoint, Idaho.

Idaho

In Idaho, US 10A went through Bonner County and the town of Sandpoint. In Sandpoint, US 10A intersected US 95. At the intersection, US 195 terminated, and US 10A would follow the shore of Lake Pend Oreille, serving the communities of Hope and Clark Fork before entering Montana.

1947 reroute
After its reroute in 1947, US 10A started in Coeur d'Alene concurrent with US 95. It would follow US 95 north to Sandpoint. At the intersection with US 2, US 10A spilt from US 95 and went east toward Clark Fork.

Montana

In Montana, the route would then follow through rural northwestern Montana and the towns of Plains and Thompson Falls parallel to the Clark Fork and Flathead rivers. It then intersected US 93 in Ravalli. It then ran concurrently with US 93 south to Wye, where US 10A ended at Desmet Junction intersecting US 10 and US 93.

History

US 10A was formed in 1941 as an alternate route of US 10 going through northwestern Montana, northern Idaho, and central Washington. In Washington, it would follow the former route of US 10 through Stevens Pass before it was rerouted in 1939. It served as an artery to isolated communities in those states, such as Clark Fork, Idaho; Plains, Montana; as well as several small towns in central Washington. It also replaced MT 3.

In 1946, representatives of the highway departments of Idaho and Washington proposed an extension of US 2 to Everett that was considered by the American Association of State Highway Officials's U.S. Route Numbering Committee in January 1946; however, the committee vetoed the proposal. The proposal resurfaced during the committee's meeting on December 20, 1946, and US 2 was approved as a replacement for US 10A from Everett to Sandpoint and US 195 from Spokane to Newport; however, US 195 would remain on road maps in Washington until at least 1951. In 1947, following the extension of US 2, US 10A was rerouted to start in Coeur d'Alene along US 95.

US 10A was decommissioned in 1967, as its parent route, US 10, was being replaced by Interstate 90 (I-90). After its decommissioning, the states of Idaho and Montana had replaced the former US 10A route with state highways. Montana renumbered MT 20, which had already been routed on US 10A by 1956, to MT 200. Idaho established SH-200 to replace US 10A a year later. Both highways were a part of a series of similarly numbered routes in Minnesota and North Dakota with the end goal being a unified federal designation.

Major intersections

1947 rerouting

See also

Notes

References

External links

Alternate (Washington–Montana)
10 Alternate
10 Alternate
10 Alternate
10 Alternate (Washington–Montana)
10 Alternate (Washington–Montana)
Transportation in King County, Washington
Transportation in Snohomish County, Washington
Transportation in Chelan County, Washington
Transportation in Spokane County, Washington
Transportation in Pend Oreille County, Washington
Transportation in Bonner County, Idaho
Transportation in Sanders County, Montana
Transportation in Lake County, Montana
Transportation in Missoula County, Montana
Transportation in Kootenai County, Idaho